Carphania fluviatilis is a species of tardigrade. It is the only known species within the genus Carphania, which is the only genus in the family Carphaniidae, which is part of the order Echiniscoidea. It was first described by Maria Grazia Binda in 1978. It is a freshwater species, endemic in Italy.

References

Echiniscoidea
Endemic fauna of Italy
Invertebrates of Europe
Animals described in 1986
Taxa named by Maria Grazia Binda